Wennington is a civil parish in Lancaster, Lancashire, England. It contains nine listed buildings that are recorded in the National Heritage List for England.  All of the listed buildings are designated at Grade II, the lowest of the three grades, which is applied to "buildings of national importance and special interest".  The parish contains the village of Wennington, and is otherwise rural.  The River Wenning passes through the parish, and the bridge crossing it is listed.  The other listed buildings consist of houses, buildings on a model farm, a boundary stone, and an animal pound.

Buildings

References

Citations

Sources

Lists of listed buildings in Lancashire
Buildings and structures in the City of Lancaster